Energetický a průmyslový holding, a.s. (EPH) is a Czech Republic (Prague) based company currently investing mainly in the energy sector in Europe, founded in 2009. The group's business lines covers the complete value chain ranging from highly efficient cogeneration, power generation, and natural gas transmission, gas storage, gas and electricity distribution and supply. The majority owner is Czech entrepreneur and lawyer Daniel Křetínský (94%), who is ranked among the richest Czechs in the long term and according to Forbes he became a dollar billionaire in 2017. The remaining 6% is distributed among selected managers of EPH. EPH employs almost 25.000 people and comprises over 50 companies.

Ownership
Company was founded in August 2009 as (indirect) subsidiary of J&T Finance Group, as of October 2009 ownership structure was PPF (40%), J&T (40%) and Daniel Křetínský. In August 2012 PPF converted part of its debt for EPH shares and increase its share to 44.4% (decreasing J&T share to 37.04% and Daniel Křetínský share to 18.52%). In June 2014 PPF sold its stake for 1.1 EUR billions, since then ownership Daniel Křetínský and Patrik Tkáč own 2/3 share and J&T 1/3 share. As of December 31, 2014 shareholders were equally BIQUES LIMITED (part of J&T PARTNERS I L.P.), MILEES LIMITED (part of J&T PARTNERS II L.P.) and EP Investment S.à r.l. (owned by Daniel Křetínský), while rest of 44.4% was treasury stock. Treasury stocks were cancelled in September 2015.

In October 2015 EPH announced its plan to reorganise all of its Central European infrastructure assets under one holding company, EP Infrastructure, and possibility of the disposal of a minority stake in that holding, including an initial public offering.

In November 2016 EPH announced change in its shareholder structure and sale of 31% stake in EP Infrastructure to Macquarie Infrastructure and Real Assets (MIRA). After this transaction Daniel Křetínský will ultimately own 94% of EPH and the remaining 6% will by owned by managers of EPH.

Activities by country

Czech Republic
Main assets held in the Czech Republic are:
  - 363 MW cogeneration coal power station near Hradec Králové and Pardubice with extensive heat distribution network
 United Energy - Most based electricity and heat production company
 Plzeňská energetika - Plzeň based electricity and heat production company
 Pražská teplárenská (50.1% share directly, 49% share on 47,3% shareholder) - Prague based heat production company
 EP Renewables - renewable power plants developer
 - freight railway company

France 

Since December 2018 EP Power Europe,  a subsidiary of EPH, is negotiating to acquire all the French assets of German group Uniper. These assets include two gas-fired power plants with a total capacity of 828 MW, two coal power plants with an installed capacity of 1,200 MW, a 150 MW biomass power plant and 100 MW of wind and solar resources. Agreements were signed in July 2019.

Germany
  - coal mining company (Profen coal mine, United Schleenhain coal mine), owner of three smaller cogeneration coal power stations
 Buschhaus Power Station and nearby 
 Saale Energie (41.9% stake) - owner of 916 MW Schkopau Power Station

On 30September 2016, Vattenfall completed the sale of its German lignite facilities to the Czech energy group EPH and its financial partner PPF Investments.  The following assets were transferred:

 power plants 
  (3,000 MW)
 Schwarze Pumpe power station (1,600 MW)
  (1,900 MW)
 coal mines
 
 
 
 
  (closed as of September 2016)

An October 2016 blog post speculates that the new owners are banking on government compensation for the forced early retirement of these assets. They may either seek capacity payments for staying online and providing backup or they may decommission and sue for lost profits.

In November 2017 EPH subsidiary EP Power Europe acquired 750 MWe Mehrum Power Station.

In May 2019 EPH subsidiary EP Logistics International acquired freight railway company .

Hungary 
In June 2015 it was announced, that EPH will acquire 95.6% stake in Budapesti Erőmű from Électricité de France. These plants meet almost 60% of the demand for heat in Budapest and generate approximately 3% of Hungarian electricity.

In December 2017 a consortium Mátra Energy Holding of EP Power Europe (EPH subsidiary) and Status Power Invest acquired 72.6% stake in Mátrai Eromu Zrt. Company is operating 950 MWe Mátra Power Plant as well as Visonta and Bükkábrány coal mine.

Italy 
In January 2015 it was announced, that EPH will acquire part of E.ON assets in Italy:  
 coal-fired power plant Fiume Santo in Sassari (600 MWe) 
 gas-fired power plants (4,900 MWe)
 Livorno Ferraris (805 MWe)
 Tavazzano (1,740 MWe) 
 Ostiglia (1,482 MWe)
 Ferrara
 Trapani 
 Scandale (814 MWe)

Ireland 
In October 2019 EP UK Investments, a subsidiary of EP Power Europe, acquired 80% share of Tynagh Energy Limited, owner of the 400 MWe gas-fired Tynagh Power Plant.

Poland
  (99.8% stake) - coal mining company

Slovakia
In January 2013, EHP acquired from GDF Suez and E.ON Slovak Gas Holding, owner of 49% share in Slovenský plynárenský priemysel for approximately €2.6 billion. In September 2013 Government of Slovakia agreed to reorganization of SPP. As result Slovakia will gain 100% stake SPP, but EPH will gain 49% stake and management control in SPP Distribúcia, that will acquire most of current SPP subsidiaries.

In May 2013 Électricité de France (EDF) confirmed that it would sell its 49 percent stake in Stredoslovenská energetika (SSE) to EPH for about 400 million €.

In December 2013 EPH acquired 40.45% stake in gas storage operator  from E.ON, while 56.15% stake is held by EPH controlled SPP Infrastructure.

In December 2015 EPH signed a contract with Enel to buy 66% stake in Slovenské elektrárne, former Slovak electric utility state monopoly. In the first phase, Enel will sell 50% of holding company of 66% stake. In the second phase, a put or a call option for remaining 50% of holding company can be exercised after receiving the operation permit of Units 3 and 4 of the Mochovce Nuclear Power Plant, which are currently under construction.

Ukraine 
In April 2020 EPH subsidiary EP Ukraine has been granted a license to explore and extract mainly natural gas in the Grunivska field (Sumy Oblast, Poltava Oblast) and Ochtyrska field (Sumy, Poltava and Kharkiv Oblast).

United Kingdom 
In November 2014 it was announced, that EPH will acquire Eggborough Power Station. The transaction was completed in January 2015.

In January 2016 EPH acquired Lynemouth power station from RWE npower. In February 2016 it was reported that EPH are entering the SME retail energy market with a new online service called Energy Scanner.

In June 2017 it was announced that EPH will acquire South Humber Bank and Langage Power Stations from Centrica.

In April 2019 AES Corporation has agreed to sell Ballylumford power station and Kilroot power station to EP UK Investments, a subsidiary of EPH. The transaction was completed in June 2019.

In March 2020 EP UK Investments acquired Humbly Grove Energy Limited, that owns and operates Humbly Grove Gas Storage facility.

See also

 Energy in the Czech Republic

References

External links
 Official website (English)

 
Electric power companies of the Czech Republic
Electric power companies of Germany
Energy companies of Poland
Energy companies of Slovakia